Represent may refer to:

 Represent (Compton's Most Wanted album) or the title song, 2000
 Represent (Fat Joe album), 1993
 Represent, an album by DJ Magic Mike, 1994
 "Represent" (song), by Nas, 1994
 "Represent", a song by the Red Jumpsuit Apparatus from Lonely Road, 2009
 "Represent", a song by Weezer, 2010

See also 
 Reprazent, a British drum and bass group
 Reprezent, a radio station based in London
 Representation (disambiguation)
 Representative (disambiguation)
 "Representin", a song by Ludacris and Kelly Rowland